Jakob Heinrich Laspeyres (9 April 1769, Berlin – 28 November 1809, Berlin) was a German entomologist especially interested in Lepidoptera. He was a Bürgermeister in Berlin. Laspeyres collection is in Museum für Naturkunde.

The moth genus Laspeyresia is named after him.

Works
Kritische Revision der neuen Ausgabe des systematischen Verzeichnisses von den Schmetterlingen der Wienergegend. Illigers’s Magazine (von Karl Illiger). Braunschweig, Karl Reichard, 1803
Sesiae Europaeae Iconibus et Descriptionibus illustratae, 32 pp., 1 pl.  Berlin. pdf

Cited references

Other references

 Horn, W. H. R. & Schenkling, S. 1928-1929: Index Litteraturae Entomologicae, Serie I: die Welt-Literatur über die gesamte Entomologie bis inklusive 1863. - Berlin-Dahlem, Selbstverlag W. Horn 1-4 XXI p., 1426 p., 4 Tafeln

German lepidopterists
1769 births
1809 deaths